Antonio López y López, 1st Marquess of Comillas, GE (1817 in Comillas – 1883 in Barcelona), was a Spanish businessman,  slave trader and shipping magnate. He was the founder of a number of important companies.

After his death his son Claudio López Bru took over the responsibility of running the companies his father had founded.

Biography
Antonio López emigrated to colonial Cuba in 1831 while still a teenager and lived in Santiago de Cuba.  
He took an interest in shipping and in 1850 he founded the "Compañia de Vapores Correos A. López" which began operations with a 400-ton  hybrid sailing ship-sidewheel steamer. This company would eventually become the Compañía Transatlántica Española ocean line in 1881.

In 1876 he became the co-founder and first president of the Banco Hispano Colonial, established in Barcelona. He also led the Banco de Crédito Mercantil.
Around that time Antonio López transferred his residence to Barcelona and married a Catalan lady, Lluïsa Bru Lassús, with whom he had four children. Claudio Lopez Bru was his fourth son. During this decade he moved to Spain the head offices of some of his companies as well. Eventually his children became part of the high society in Barcelona and Antonio López became the father-in-law of Eusebi Güell after his daughter Isabel López Bru married him.

At the prompting of Jesuit Tomás Gómez Carral Antonio López accepted to finance the construction of the Comillas Pontifical University, but he died in 1883 in Barcelona in the very year of the groundbreaking ceremony.

Legacy and honors

Antonio López was the founder of the following companies: Compañía General de Tabacos de Filipinas, Ferrocarriles del Norte, and Compañía Transatlántica Española, among others.

In 1877 writer Jacint Verdaguer wrote the Catalan language poem L'Atlàntida in his honour.

He was ennobled with the title of Marquess of Comillas in 1878 and was also awarded the Order of Isabella the Catholic. King Alfonso XII made a eulogy of Antonio López following his death, saying that "Spain has lost one of the men who has given it the greatest service."

In Barcelona there is a monument dedicated to him and the companies he founded. Located close to the Compañía Transatlántica Española head office, the monument A López and López was erected in 1884 and was designed by architect Josep Oriol Mestres and sculptor Venanci Vallmitjana. On its sides it has reliefs by Lluís Puiggener, Joan Roig i Solé, Rossend Nobas and Francesc Pagès. The monument was destroyed in 1936, but was restored in 1944 by Frederic Marès. On March 4, 2018 the monument was finally removed after a campaign denouncing the involvement of Antonio López in the slave trade.

Arms

See also
Antonio Lopez (shipwreck)

References

External links 

Pontifical University of Comillas - History

1817 births
1883 deaths
Businesspeople from Cantabria
Marquesses of Spain
People from Cantabria
Knights Grand Cross of the Order of Isabella the Catholic